Jules Clévenot (7 June 1875 – 11 September 1933) was a French water polo player and swimmer. He won a bronze medal in water polo at the 1900 Summer Olympics and finished seventh and fourth in the 200 m freestyle and 200 m team swimming, respectively.

See also
 List of Olympic medalists in water polo (men)

References

External links
 

1875 births
1933 deaths
Sportspeople from Bas-Rhin
French male freestyle swimmers
French male water polo players
Swimmers at the 1900 Summer Olympics
Water polo players at the 1900 Summer Olympics
Olympic swimmers of France
Olympic bronze medalists for France
Olympic water polo players of France
Olympic medalists in water polo
Medalists at the 1900 Summer Olympics
19th-century French people
20th-century French people
French male long-distance swimmers